Łazów may refer to the following places:
Łazów, Łask County in Łódź Voivodeship (central Poland)
Łazów, Radomsko County in Łódź Voivodeship (central Poland)
Łazów, Subcarpathian Voivodeship (south-east Poland)
Łazów, Masovian Voivodeship (east-central Poland)